Vysoká pri Morave is a village north of Bratislava, the capital city of Slovakia. It is situated in the Malacky District, Bratislava Region on the border to Austria.

References

External links

 Official page
https://web.archive.org/web/20070513023228/http://www.statistics.sk/mosmis/eng/run.html

Villages and municipalities in Malacky District